Equilibrium is 2012 painting by Carmen Herrera. It is in the collection of the Metropolitan Museum of Art.

References 

Paintings in the collection of the Metropolitan Museum of Art